Eva Mei (born 1967) is an Italian coloratura soprano.

Mei was born in Fabriano. She graduated from the Conservatorio Luigi Cherubini in Florence. In 1990, at the Mozart Competition in Vienna, she won the Catarina Cavalieri Prize for her interpretation of Konstanze in Mozart's Die Entführung aus dem Serail.

Since her debut at the Vienna State Opera in 1990, she has appeared in the other theatres of Europe and of the world, including: Berlin State Opera, Royal Opera House in London, La Scala in Milan (1993), Rossini Opera Festival in Pesaro (1996), Salzburg Festival,  in Tokyo.

In 1994, she performed in Norma as Adalgisa alongside Jane Eaglen in the title role conducted by Riccardo Muti at the Ravenna Festival.

In February 2011, she starred in as Pamina in a new production of The Magic Flute premiered at the Vorarlberger Landestheater.

She has worked with the conductors Roberto Abbado, Bruno Campanella, Nikolaus Harnoncourt, Zubin Mehta.

Mei's discography includes Don Pasquale, I Capuleti e i Montecchi, Norma, Tancredi, arias by Bellini, Donizetti and Rossini, Beethoven's Missa solemnis, Handel's cantatas, and Pergolesi's Stabat Mater.

Recordings
Thaïs by Massenet: Eva Mei, Michele Pertusi. La Fenice, Venice (2004) (video)

References

External links

Interview with Eva Mei by Bruce Duffie, January 24, 2000
Eva Mei PrimaFila artists
Eva Mei In Art Management

1967 births
People from the Province of Ancona
Italian operatic sopranos
Living people
20th-century Italian women opera singers
21st-century Italian women opera singers